Farmullah Mansoor is a Nepalese politician. Mansoor is Deputy general secretary of Nepali Congress.  He is also the member of 2nd Nepalese Constituent assembly. He was elected to the Pratinidhi Sabha in the 1999 election on behalf of the Nepali Congress.

Electoral history

2017 legislative elections

2013 Constituent Assembly election

1999 legislative elections

1994 legislative elections

1991 legislative elections

References

Nepalese Muslims
Living people
Nepali Congress politicians from Madhesh Province
Year of birth missing (living people)
Place of birth missing (living people)
Nepal MPs 1999–2002
Members of the 2nd Nepalese Constituent Assembly